North Texas (also commonly called North Central Texas) is a term used primarily by residents of Dallas, Fort Worth, and surrounding areas to describe much of the north central portion of the U.S. state of Texas. Residents of the Dallas–Fort Worth metroplex generally consider North Texas to include the area south of Oklahoma, east of Abilene, west of Paris, and north of Waco. A more precise term for this region would be the northern part of the central portion of Texas. It does not include the Panhandle of Texas, which expands further north than the region previously described, nor does it include most of the region near the northern border of Texas.

Today, North Texas is centered upon the Dallas–Fort Worth metroplex, the largest metropolitan area in Texas and the Southern United States. People in the Dallas and Fort Worth areas sometimes use the terms "Metroplex", "DFW", and "North Texas" interchangeably. However, North Texas refers to a much larger area that includes many rural counties along the northern border. During the early years of the American Civil War, there were many Unionists in the rural counties, with there being few slaveholders. Many of the largest cities in North Texas outside Dallas and Fort Worth still follow a rural Southern way of life, especially in dialect, mannerisms, religion, and cuisine. Texan English, a dialect unique to the state, is most pronounced in this region.

History
Indigenous tribes in North Texas included the Caddo, Tawakoni, Wichita, Kickapoo and Comanche. With European colonization, Mexican independence, and Texan independence and annexation to the United States, many of these tribes experienced demographic decline through relocation, slavery, etc. Since European colonization and the independence movements, the North Texas area was settled and most notably developed the cities of Dallas and Fort Worth.

Climate
The North Texas climate is subtropical with hot summers. It is also continental, characterized by a wide annual temperature range. Average annual precipitation also varies considerably, ranging from less than 28 to more than 48 inches (700–1200 mm). Severe storms are frequent in the spring, as the area lies in the southern section of "tornado alley".

South is the prevailing wind direction, and southerly winds are frequently high and persist for several days. Strong northerly winds often occur during the passage of cold fronts. Dusty conditions are infrequent, occurring mostly with westerly winds. Dust storm frequency and intensity depend on soil conditions in eastern New Mexico, West Texas, and the Texas Panhandle.

Winters can be mild, but northers occur about three times each month, and often are accompanied by sudden drops in temperature. In Dallas, a record-setting 12.8 inches of snow fell in February 2010. Periods of extreme cold that occasionally occur are short-lived, so that even in January mild weather occurs frequently.

The highest temperatures of summer are associated with fair skies, westerly winds and moderate to high humidities. Characteristically, hot spells in summer are broken into three- to five-day periods by thunderstorm activity. There are only a few nights each summer when the low temperature exceeds 80 °F (27 °C). Summer daytime temperatures frequently exceed 100 °F (38 °C). Air conditioners are recommended for maximum comfort indoors and while traveling via automobile.

Throughout the year, rainfall occurs more frequently during the night. Usually, periods of rainy weather last for only a day or two, and are followed by several days with fair skies. A large part of the annual precipitation results from thunderstorm activity, with occasional heavy rainfall over brief periods of time. Thunderstorms occur throughout the year, but are most frequent in the spring. Hail falls on about two or three days a year, ordinarily with only slight and scattered damage. Windstorms occurring during thunderstorm activity are sometimes destructive. Snowfall is uncommon.

The average length of the warm season (freeze-free period) is about 249 days. The average last occurrence of 32 °F (0 °C) or below is mid March and the average first occurrence of 32 °F or below is in late November.

Counties
Although the terms "Northeastern Texas" or "North Texas" are not official state designations, the Texas State Data Center and Office of the State Demographer lists the following counties as belonging to the North Central Texas Council of Governments (NCTCOG):

Collin 
Dallas
Denton
Ellis
Erath
Hood
Hunt

Johnson
Kaufman
Navarro
Palo Pinto
Parker
Rockwall

Somervell
Tarrant
Wise

The Texas State Demographer also lists the following regional county groupings, some or all of which are often included in the informal meaning of the terms "North Texas" or "North Central Texas."

Nortex Regional Planning Commission:
Archer
Baylor
Clay
Cottle
Foard
Hardeman
Jack
Montague
Wichita
Wilbarger
Young

Texoma Council of Governments:
Cooke
Fannin
Grayson

Additionally, some other Texas counties contiguous with those named above are sometimes included in the general meaning of "North Texas."

Major cities

Other cities and towns

Addison
Aledo
Alma
Alvarado
Alvord
Angus
Anna
Annetta
Annetta North
Annetta South
Archer City
Argyle
Aubrey
Aurora
Azle
Bailey
Balch Springs
Bardwell
Barry
Bartonville
Bedford
Bellevue
Bells
Benbrook
Blooming Grove
Blue Mound
Blue Ridge
Bonham
Bowie
Boyd
Brazos Bend
Breckenridge
Briaroaks
Bridgeport
Bryson
Burkburnett
Burleson
Byers
Caddo Mills
Callisburg
Campbell
Cashion Community
Cedar Hill
Celeste
Celina
Chico
Chillicothe
Cleburne
Cockrell Hill
Colleyville

Collinsville
Commerce
Cool
Copper Canyon
Combine
Coppell
Corinth
Corral City
Corsicana
Cottonwood
Coyote Flats
Crandall
Cresson
Cross Roads
Cross Timber
Crowell
Crowley
Dalworthington Gardens
Dawson
Decatur
Dean
DeCordova
Denison
Desoto
Dish
Dodd City
Dorchester
Double Oak
Dublin
Duncanville
Eagle Mountain
Ector
Edgecliff Village
Elizabethtown
Emhouse
Ennis
Euless
Eureka
Everman
Fairview
Farmers Branch
Farmersville
Fate
Ferris
Forest Hill
Forney
Frost
Gainesville
Garrett
Glen Rose

Glenn Heights
Godley
Goodlow
Gordon
Graford
Graham
Granbury
Grandview
Grapevine
Greenville
Gunter
Hackberry
Haltom City
Haslet
Hawk Cove
Heath
Hebron
Henrietta
Hickory Creek
Highland Park
Highland Village
Holliday
Honey Grove
Howe
Hudson Oaks
Hurst
Hutchins
Iowa Park
Italy
Jacksboro
Jolly
Josephine
Joshua
Justin
Kaufman
Keene
Keller
Kemp
Kennedale
Kerens
Knollwood
Krugerville
Ladonia
Lancaster
Lake Bridgeport
Lake Dallas
Lake Worth
Lakeside
Lakeside City
Lakewood Village

Lavon
Leonard
Lewisville
Lincoln Park
Lindsay
Lipan
Little Elm
Lone Oak
Lowry Crossing
Lucas
Mabank
Mansfield
Maypearl
Megargel
McLendon-Chisholm
Melissa
Meridian
Mesquite
Midlothian
Mildred
Milford
Millsap
Mineral Wells
Mingus
Mobile City
Muenster
Murphy
Mustang
Navarro
Nevada
New Fairview
New Hope
Newark
Newcastle
Neylandville
Nocona
Northlake
North Richland Hills
Oak Grove
Oak Leaf
Oak Point
Oak Ridge (Cooke County)
Oak Ridge (Kaufman County)
Oak Valley
Olney
Ovilla
Paducah
Palmer
Pantego
Paradise

Parker
Pecan Hill
Pelican Bay
Petrolia
Pilot Point
Pleasant Valley
Ponder
Post Oak Bend City
Pottsboro
Powell
Princeton
Prosper
Providence Village
Quanah
Quinlan
Ravenna
Red Oak
Retreat
Rhome
Reno
Rice
Richland
Richland Hills
Rio Vista
River Oaks
Roanoke
Rockwall
Rowlett
Royse City
Runaway Bay
Sachse
Sadler
Saginaw
Sanctuary
Sanger
Sansom Park
Savoy
Seagoville
Scotland
Scurry
Seymour
Shady Shores
Sherman
Southlake
Southmayd
Springtown
St. Jo
St. Paul
Stephenville

Strawn
Sunnyvale
Talty
Terrell
The Colony
Tioga
Tolar
Tom Bean
Trenton
Trophy Club
Union Valley
University Park
Valley View
Van Alstyne
Venus
Vernon
Waxahachie
Watauga
Weatherford
West Tawakoni
Westlake
Westover Hills
Westworth Village
Whitesboro
White Settlement
Whitewright
Wilmer
Windom
Windthorst
Wolfe City
Wylie

Statistical areas
In the North Texas region there is one combined statistical area, three metropolitan areas, and seven micropolitan areas.

Dallas–Fort Worth TX-OK combined statistical area

Metropolitan statistical areas (MSAs)

 Dallas–Fort Worth–Arlington is the only MSA in Texas subdivided into metropolitan divisions:
Dallas–Plano–Irving (Collin, Dallas, Denton, Ellis, Hunt, Kaufman, and Rockwall counties)
Fort Worth–Arlington–Grapevine (Johnson, Parker, Tarrant, and Wise counties)
 Sherman–Denison (Grayson County)

Micropolitan statistical areas (μSAs)
 Athens (Henderson County) (In East Texas)
 Bonham (Fannin County)
 Corsicana (Navarro County)
 Durant, OK (Bryan County, Oklahoma) (In Oklahoma)
 Gainesville (Cooke County)
 Granbury (Hood County)
 Mineral Wells (Palo Pinto County)

Wichita Falls area

Metropolitan statistical areas (MSAs)
 Wichita Falls (Archer, Clay, Wichita counties)
Micropolitan statistical areas (μSAs)
 Vernon (Wilbarger County)

Other

Micropolitan statistical Areas (μSAs)
 Stephenville (Erath County)

Economy

Top employers
Dallas–Fort Worth metroplex

Wichita Falls metropolitan area

Sherman–Denison metropolitan area

Colleges and universities

Sports
The North Texas region has teams from the four major professional sports leagues. Major professional sports first came to the area in 1960, when the Dallas Cowboys began competing in the National Football League and the Dallas Texans began competing in the American Football League. (The Texans later relocated to Kansas City and became the Chiefs). In 1972, Major League Baseball's Washington Senators moved to Arlington to become the Texas Rangers, named after the statewide law enforcement agency. The National Basketball Association expanded into North Texas in 1980 when the Dallas Mavericks were added to the league. The fourth sport was added in 1993 when the Minnesota North Stars of the National Hockey League moved to Dallas, becoming the Dallas Stars.

The Major League Soccer team FC Dallas is based in Frisco, and the Dallas Wings of the WNBA plays in Arlington.  The area is also home to many minor league professional teams and four colleges that compete in NCAA Division I athletics.

Major professional sports teams

^- Indicates year team relocated to the area

Other professional teams

^- Indicates year team relocated to the area

Division I college teams

The headquarters for both the Big 12 and Conference USA are located in Irving, and the Southland Conference headquarters are in Frisco.

Transportation

Commercial airports

Dallas Love Field
Dallas/Fort Worth International Airport
Wichita Falls Municipal Airport

Public transit

Dallas Area Rapid Transit
Denton County Transportation Authority
Falls Ride
Trinity Metro
TAPS

Major highways

Interstates

U.S. Routes

Tollways

See also
List of geographical regions in Texas
Dallas/Fort Worth Area Tourism Council

References

Regions of Texas